E.SUN Commercial Bank, Ltd. (Commonly known as E.SUN Bank, E.SUN) is a Taiwanese bank headquartered in Taipei, Taiwan.

E.SUN Bank was founded in 1992 by Mr. Yung-Jen Huang, the current chairman of E.SUN financial holding company. Responding to the surging Asia market and trend of financial innovation, E.SUN Bank is focus on its priority markets in Asia, Australia, and US, with 139 branches in Taiwan and 28 branches and subsidiaries in 9 countries and jurisdictions as of December 31, 2020.

Artificial intelligence and digitalization has been applied to each aspect of its business, including credit card fraud detection, product recommendation, auto personal loan, etc.

E.SUN is committed to ESG by contributing its core competencies in areas such as corporate governance, customer service, employee care, environmental sustainability, and community involvement. By delivering a significant contribution in ESG performance, E.SUN is listed in Dow Jones Sustainability Index (DJSI) for 7th consecutive year in 2020, and ranked 4th in the Asian banking industry, 6th in banking industry of the world.

In 2020 E.SUN was noted for their effective response to the COVID-19 outbreak.

Overseas operations
 5 operating sites under E.SUN Bank (China), China subsidiary
 14 presences under Union Commercial Bank, Cambodian subsidiary
 Hong Kong Branch
 Los Angeles Branch
 Singapore Branch
 Dong-Nai Branch
 Sydney Branch
 Brisbane Branch
 Yangon Branch
 Tokyo Branch
 Hanoi City Representative Office (Vietnam)

Financial Performance
E.SUN Bank's overall profit after tax in 2020 reached NT$16.465 billion. The EPS, ROE, and ROA were NT$1.43, 9.45% and 0.61%, respectively. The overall business maintained steady growth. In 2020, the growth rates of total loans and total deposit were 12.3% and 19.4%, respectively. Loan growth was achieved while maintaining sound asset quality. The NPL ratio was 0.19%. The NPL coverage ratio was 656.3%.

Glory and Honor
 Listed in DJSI (Dow Jones Sustainability Index) for the 8th consecutive year since 2014
 E.SUN Bank received the 4th Executive Yuan's 25th National Quality Award, becoming the only corporate receiving the award for 4 times (3 for corporate and 1 for individual)
 Received 12 Best Bank in Taiwan and 16 highest awards for CSR since 2017 (Forbes, The Banker, Global Finance, Asiamoney, the Asset, The Asian Banker etc.)
 Received 20 Highly Commended Awards from Taiwan Academy of Banking and Finance, a record high in industry
 E.SUN Bank ranked No.1 among Taiwan's banks in World Top 500 Most Valuable Banking Brands from the Banker (2019, 2020)

See also
Taiwan
List of banks in Taiwan
Economy of Taiwan
List of companies of Taiwan

References

External links
E.SUN Financial Holding Company (English)

E.SUN Commercial Bank (Chinese)
E.SUN Commercial Bank (English)

1992 establishments in Taiwan
Banks established in 1992
Banks of Taiwan